is a Japanese footballer currently playing as a goalkeeper for Oita Trinita.

Career statistics

Club
.

Notes

References

External links

2002 births
Living people
Association football people from Aichi Prefecture
Japanese footballers
Japan youth international footballers
Association football goalkeepers
Nagoya Grampus players
Oita Trinita players